Pterogmus rufipes is a species of beetles in the family Carabidae, the only species in the genus Pterogmus.

References

Psydrinae
Monotypic Carabidae genera
Beetles described in 1920